Scientific Perspectives on Divine Action is a five volume set that represents more than a decade of scientific-theological conferences sponsored by the Vatican Observatory and the Center for Theology and the Natural Sciences.

Volumes
Neuroscience and the Person: Scientific Perspectives on Divine Action 
Chaos and Complexity: Scientific Perspectives on Divine Action
Quantum Cosmology and the Laws of Nature: Scientific Perspectives on Divine Action
Evolutionary and Molecular Biology: Scientific Perspectives on Divine Action
Quantum Mechanics: Scientific Perspectives on Divine Action, Robert John Russell (Corporate Author), Philip Clayton (Corporate Author), Kirk Wegter-McNelly (Ed), John Polkinghorne (Ed)

See also
 Divine Action and Modern Science
 Natural theology
 Theophysics

References

Books about religion and science